Carter Rowney (born May 10, 1989) is a Canadian professional ice hockey forward currently under contract with Löwen Frankfurt of the Deutsche Eishockey Liga (DEL). Rowney has previously played in the National Hockey League (NHL) for the Pittsburgh Penguins, Anaheim Ducks and Detroit Red Wings.

Playing career
Rowney played junior hockey with the Grande Prairie Storm of the Alberta Junior Hockey League (AJHL).

Having not been selected in any NHL Entry Draft, Rowney attended the University of North Dakota, where he majored in managerial finance. He played collegiate hockey for North Dakota's ice hockey team in the Western Collegiate Hockey Association (WCHA) from 2009 to 2013. In 2010–11 and 2011–12, Rowney was named to the All-WCHA Academic Team. On September 18, 2012, North Dakota suspended Rowney (along with teammates Andrew MacWilliam, Corban Knight and Danny Kristo) for the opening game of the 2012–13 season because of a violation of team rules that occurred during a team party.

On April 9, 2013, Rowney signed an amateur tryout agreement with the Abbotsford Heat of the American Hockey League (AHL). On October 3, 2013, Rowney signed an AHL contract with the Wilkes-Barre/Scranton Penguins. He re-signed with Wilkes-Barre/Scranton on July 24, 2014, on another one-year AHL contract.

On March 9, 2016, after three seasons playing with Wilkes-Barre/Scranton and the Wheeling Nailers of the ECHL, Rowney signed his first NHL contract, a two-year, two-way contract with the Pittsburgh Penguins worth an average annual value of $612,500. He was named the AHL Player of the Month for March 2016, recording 17 points in 12 games for Wilkes-Barre/Scranton.

Rowney made his NHL debut on January 31, 2017, in Pittsburgh's game against the Nashville Predators. On February 4, Rowney recorded his first NHL point, assisting on a Kris Letang goal against the St. Louis Blues. On March 17, 2017, Rowney scored his first NHL goal, against New Jersey Devils goaltender Keith Kinkaid in a 6–4 Penguins win. On June 11, 2017, after a 2–0 shutout victory over Nashville, Rowney won his first Stanley Cup with the Penguins.

In the 2017–18 season, Rowney was injured on October 21, 2017, suffering a broken hand after blocking a shot against the Tampa Bay Lightning. He returned to the line-up on November 24 after missing 14 games. He was injured again on January 2, suffering an upper-body injury during a game against the Philadelphia Flyers. He returned to game action on February 2, missing 11 games.

Following five seasons with the Penguins organization, on July 2, 2018, Rowney left as a free agent to sign a three-year contract with the Anaheim Ducks. In his first two seasons with the Ducks, Rowney recorded his most productive seasons at the NHL level, recording a career high 20 points in the  season, followed by 19 points in the  campaign. Entering the final year of his contract with the Ducks, Rowney was limited by injury to just 19 games in the shortened  season, recording 6 assists.

As a free agent from the rebuilding Ducks, Rowney was signed to a one-year, $825,000 contract with the Detroit Red Wings on September 2, 2021.

Following six seasons in the NHL, Rowney having concluded his contract with the Red Wings opted to continue his professional career abroad, signing a one-year contract with German club, Löwen Frankfurt of the DEL, on September 12, 2022.

Personal life
In August 2016, Rowney married Danielle Luetzen, a former North Dakota volleyball player. Their first child, Anders, was born on May 14, 2017.

Career statistics

Awards and honours

References

External links
 

1989 births
Abbotsford Heat players
Ice hockey people from Alberta
Anaheim Ducks players
Canadian ice hockey forwards
Detroit Red Wings players
Grande Prairie Storm players
People from Grande Prairie
Living people
Löwen Frankfurt players
North Dakota Fighting Hawks men's ice hockey players
Pittsburgh Penguins players
Stanley Cup champions
Undrafted National Hockey League players
Wheeling Nailers players
Wilkes-Barre/Scranton Penguins players